SLAC can mean

 SL Agritech Corporation, Philippine hybrid rice company
 SLAC National Accelerator Laboratory, Stanford Linear Accelerator Center
 SLAC Wrist, a wrist in which the scapholunate ligament is ruptured
 SLAC (basketball club), a Guinean basketball club  
 Sri Lanka Armoured Corps
 Student Labor Action Coalition
 SLAC, an acronym meaning “small liberal arts college"

See also
Slack (disambiguation)